Budanje is a settlement in the upper Vipava Valley in the Municipality of Ajdovščina in the traditional Inner Carniola region of Slovenia. It is now generally regarded as part of the Slovenian Littoral. It includes the hamlets of Avžlak, Brith, Kodelska Vas, Žgavska Vas, Krašnovska Vas, Severska Vas, Kranjčevska Vas, Pirčevska Vas, Grapa, Žaga, Perovce, Šumljak, and Log.

Name
Budanje was attested in written sources in 1763–87 as Bdanije, Bedanije, and Bedanje. The name is probably derived from the hypocorism Budan; if so, the name is originally a plural demonym meaning 'inhabitants of Budan's village'.

History
Budanje annexed the formerly independent settlement of Severska Vas in 1952.

Churches
There are three churches in Budanje. The parish church in the settlement is dedicated to Saint Nicholas and belongs to the Koper Diocese. A second church belonging to the parish is built on a small hill above the main village and is dedicated to Saint Acacius. A church in the hamlet of Log is dedicated to Our Lady Comforter of the Afflicted and belongs to the Parish of Vipava.

References

External links 

Budanje at Geopedia

Populated places in the Municipality of Ajdovščina